SWZ may refer to:

Western Sydney Airport, an airport sometimes known by this code
Eswatini (formerly Swaziland), a country with the three-letter country code of SWZ